A belt manlift or manlift is a device for moving passengers between floors of a building. It is a simple belt with steps or platforms and handholds rather than an elevator with cars. Its design is similar to that of a paternoster lift. The belt is a loop that moves in a single direction, so one can go up or down by using the opposite sides of the loop. The belt moves continuously, so one can simply get on when a step passes and step off when passing any desired floor without having to call and wait for a car to arrive. 

Although not technically a paternoster, it has many of the same design features and hazards associated with its use. There are several companies still making belt manlifts. They are used in grain elevators and parking garages where space is limited. In Canada, manlifts were retrofitted in the early 1990s with safety features after fatal accidents. Safety concerns have led to a decline in their use.

In popular culture 
The opening sequence of the 1978 film The Driver features Ryan O'Neal ascending through a parking garage on a manlift. A manlift is clearly visible in the silent film Metropolis. The film Our Man Flint (1966) features an operational manlift within the volcanic island complex, shot at the LADWP Scattergood Generating Station. Hitman Bruce Willis dispatches a bookie from a manlift, while ascending through a parking garage in the opening scene of Lucky Number Slevin.

See also
Man engine

References

External links 
 Endless Belt Manlifts

Elevators
 Vertical transport devices